Ayvalı Dam is a dam in Kahramanmaraş Province, Turkey, built between 1995 and 2005.

See also
List of dams and reservoirs in Turkey

External links
DSI

Dams in Eskişehir Province
Dams in Kahramanmaraş Province
Dams completed in 2005